Gabriela Ortigoza is a Mexican writer and screenwriter. She has made her career in television for Televisa (Mexico). Her telenovelas have been broadcast in different countries in Latin America, North America, Europe and Asia.

Her most successful soap operas are: Simplemente María (1989), María José (1995), Camila (1998), Niña amada mía (2003), Contra viento y marea (2005), La mujer del Vendaval (2012) and Sin tu mirada (2017).

Filmography

Original 
 Amor de papel (1993-1994)
 Baila conmigo (1992) with Susan Crowley
 Tres son peor que una (1992)

Adaptations 
 La madrastra (2022) original of Arturo Moya Grau
 Sin tu mirada (2017-2018) original of Delia Fiallo
 Mi adorable maldición (2017) original of Julio Jimenez
 Second part of Hasta el fin del mundo (2014-2015) original of Enrique Estevanez
 Third part of Por siempre mi amor (2013-2014) original of Abel Santa Cruz and Eric Vonn
 La mujer del Vendaval (2012-2013) original of Camilo Hernández
 Ni contigo ni sin ti (2011) original of Cassiano Gabus Méndez
 Juro Que Te Amo (2008-2009) original of Liliana Abud
 Yo amo a Juan Querendón (2007) original of Felipe Salmanca and Dago García
 Second part of Contra viento y marea (2005) original of Manuel Muñoz Rico
 Apuesta por un amor (2004-2005) original of Bernardo Romero Pereiro
 Niña amada mía (2003) original of César Miguel Rondón
 Por un beso (2000-2001) original of Inés Rodena
 Por tu amor (1999) original of Caridad Bravo Adams
 Camila (1998) original of Inés Rodena
 Sin ti (1997-1998) original of Inés Rodena
 María José (1995) original of Inés Rodena
 Alcanzar una estrella (1990) original of Jesús Calzada
 Simplemente María (1989-1990) with Carlos Romero and Kary Fajer, original of Celia Alcántara

New versions rewritten by herself 
 Simplemente María (2015-2016) remake de Simplemente María

Literary edits 
 Second part of Agujetas de color de rosa (1994-1995) written by Susan Crowley
 Carrusel (1989-1990) written by Ley Quintana and Valeria Phillips
 Rosa salvaje (1987-1988) written by Carlos Romero

Prizes and nominations

Premios TVyNovelas

TV Adicto Golden Awards

References 

Mexican dramatists and playwrights
Mexican women writers
Writers from Mexico City
20th-century Mexican women
21st-century Mexican women
1962 births
Living people